Zprdeleklika (literally meaning "Luck from the arse", in more free translation "Fucking big luck") is the second album by Czech hip hop group Chaozz. It received positive reviews, and was certified gold in both Slovakia and the Czech Republic. Music videos were made for "Chaozz veci", "Hej lidi" and "Zprdeleklika", as well as for non-album single "Sorry" with Slovak punk band No Gravity, which is the bonus track to the 1998 reissue of this album .

Track listing

References

1997 albums
Chaozz albums